Sreejith Ramanan is an Indian contemporary theatre director, actor, theatre maker, researcher and theatre-trainer who has been described by the media as "a versatile Indian contemporary theatre actor". Over the course of his wide-ranging career, he has also worked as a choreographer, stage designer, theatre technical director, Sound and Lighting designer. He is best known for his collaborations with cross-cultural theatrical adventures with notable numerous artists, theatre directors, including Hiroshi Koike, Dr Phillip B Zarrilli, Uichiro Fueda, Ram Gopal Bajaj, S.Ramanujam, Abhilash Pillai, Leela Alaniz, Kok Heng Leun and Terence Crawford

Education
Bachelor of Theatre Arts with 1st RANK (Acting) from School of Drama(2001), University of Calicut Kerala, Master of Performing Arts (Theatre Arts) with 1st Class from the University of Hyderabad in 2003, Master of Philosophy in Theatre from Mahatma Gandhi University-School of Letters, Kerala and he has successfully completed higher education at Intercultural theatre institute formerly known as TTRP, Theatre Training & Research Programme in Singapore.

Theatre Productions
More than 80 productions in India, Japan, Singapore, Indonesia and Malaysia

Awards and honours

2003: Kerala Sangeeta Nataka Academy award for Best Actor for Chayamukhi directed by Prasant Narayanan
2002-2004: Government of India, Ministry of Human Resource Development, Department of Culture's Scholarship For Young Artist
2001: G. Sankara Pillai Endowment Award for securing 1st Rank in School of Drama, Kerala

Films

Yakusha Co. Ltd
It’s a movie spanning cultural boundaries of Asia both in the range of collaborators and depiction of thematic. A Zero budget production, ‘Yakusha Co. Ltd’ uses tradition of South East Asia in its cultural narrative. In this production, actors from Japanese instrumental acting background and the modern camera eyes from the Singapore blended with the director Sreejith Ramanan and narrative from younger generation of Indian dramatic and literary heritage. The narrative forms a cultural landscape through the layers of performing arts and the ethos of artistic mindset. The film was premiered at the inaugural Asian Intercultural Conference (2008) organized by Theatre training and research programme in collaboration with the National University of Singapore, Theatre studies programme in Singapore. It was selected to Swaralaya International film festival and Sreejith Ramanan has won the Award for Best Director, citation presented by the fifth Swaralaya International Film Festival, Kerala in 2008

References

External links
http://kikh.com/mahabharata
https://web.archive.org/web/20160304023041/http://iti.edu.sg/past-events/the-divine-wind-and-tears-lost-in-the-rain-a-play-devised-by-cast-and-director/
https://web.archive.org/web/20150203213843/http://sangeetnatak.gov.in/sna/events2005-06/2005-06rangpratibha3.htm

See also
Dramaturgy

Indian theatre directors
Indian male stage actors
Male actors from Kollam
Male actors in Malayalam theatre
Dramaturges
Living people
1977 births
Theatre practitioners
Acting theorists
Indian drama teachers
21st-century Indian male actors
University of Kerala alumni
20th-century Indian male actors